Bay Head is a borough in Ocean County, New Jersey, United States. As of the 2010 United States Census, the borough's population was 968, reflecting a decline of 270 (−21.8%) from the 1,238 counted in the 2000 Census, which had in turn increased by 12 (+1.0%) from the 1,226 counted in the 1990 Census. Bay Head is situated on the Barnegat Peninsula, also known as Barnegat Bay Island, a long, narrow barrier island that separates Barnegat Bay from the Atlantic Ocean.  Together with Mantoloking, Bay Head is considered part of the Jersey Shore's "Gold Coast".

Bay Head was incorporated as a Borough by an act of the New Jersey Legislature on June 15, 1886, from portions of Brick Township, based on the results of a referendum held three days earlier.

The community was supposed to have been named "Bayhead" after the Bayhead Land Company that developed the area in the 1870s. A railroad sign posted in the 1880s labeled the station as "Bay Head," and the name stuck when the borough was incorporated in 1886. The name also comes from the town's location, which is at the "head" of Barnegat Bay.

History
The Bayhead Land Company was incorporated on September 6, 1879, capitalized at $12,000. The founding partners were David H. Mount of Rocky Hill, and three Princeton men: Edward Howe, his brother Leavitt Howe and William Harris. Within several years, the resort had grown in population, with a seawall installed, roads built and graded. In 1882, Bay Head had 20 new cottages and a population of 75.

The first post office was established in Bay Head in the summer of 1882. Julius Foster was first postmaster.

The Bay Head Historic District, listed in the New Jersey and the National Registers of Historic places in 2005, includes over 550 contributing structures (over half of the town's buildings) making it one of the largest historic districts in New Jersey. Bay Head's historic district is architecturally significant for its large collection of well-preserved Shingle Style, Stick Style, and Queen Anne Style structures.

The  stone rubble seawall built in 1882, which had been buried by dunes and largely forgotten, played a role in reducing damage to the town by Hurricane Sandy.

Geography
According to the United States Census Bureau, the borough had a total area of 0.71 square miles (1.83 km2), including 0.59 square miles (1.52 km2) of land and 0.12 square miles (0.32 km2) of water (17.32%).

Unincorporated communities, localities and place names located partially or completely within the borough include Twilight Lake.

The borough borders the Ocean County municipalities of Brick Township, Mantoloking, Point Pleasant and Point Pleasant Beach.

Demographics

Census 2010

The Census Bureau's 2006–2010 American Community Survey showed that (in 2010 inflation-adjusted dollars) median household income was $88,417 (with a margin of error of +/− $13,902) and the median family income was $134,583 (+/− $24,739). Males had a median income of $75,833 (+/− $22,227) versus $60,625 (+/− $37,439) for females. The per capita income for the borough was $78,226 (+/− $12,220). About 0.9% of families and 1.4% of the population were below the poverty line, including 4.0% of those under age 18 and none of those age 65 or over.

Census 2000

As of the 2000 United States Census there were 1,238 people, 584 households, and 349 families residing in the borough. The racial makeup of the borough was 97.98% White, 0.16% African American, 0.08% Native American, 0.57% Asian, 0.48% from other races, and 0.73% from two or more races. Hispanic or Latino of any race were 1.29% of the population.

There were 584 households, out of which 16.6% had children under the age of 18 living with them, 51.5% were married couples living together, 5.8% had a female householder with no husband present, and 40.1% were non-families. 35.4% of all households were made up of individuals, and 14.2% had someone living alone who was 65 years of age or older. The average household size was 2.12 and the average family size was 2.73.

In the borough the population was spread out, with 15.4% under the age of 18, 4.0% from 18 to 24, 21.7% from 25 to 44, 33.7% from 45 to 64, and 25.2% who were 65 years of age or older. The median age was 52 years. For every 100 females, there were 90.2 males. For every 100 females age 18 and over, there were 88.3 males.

The median income for a household in the borough was $77,790, and the median income for a family was $93,055. Males had a median income of $64,063 versus $38,672 for females. The per capita income for the borough was $49,639. About 0.3% of families and 3.0% of the population were below the poverty line, including 2.8% of those under age 18 and 2.1% of those age 65 or over.

Government

Local government
Bay Head is governed under the Borough form of New Jersey municipal government, which is used in 218 municipalities (of the 564) statewide, making it the most common form of government in New Jersey. The governing body is comprised of the Mayor and the Borough Council, with all positions elected at-large on a partisan basis as part of the November general election. The Mayor is elected directly by the voters to a four-year term of office. The Borough Council is comprised of six members elected to serve three-year terms on a staggered basis, with two seats coming up for election each year in a three-year cycle. The Borough form of government used by Bay Head is a "weak mayor / strong council" government in which council members act as the legislative body with the mayor presiding at meetings and voting only in the event of a tie. The mayor can veto ordinances subject to an override by a two-thirds majority vote of the council. The mayor makes committee and liaison assignments for council members, and most appointments are made by the mayor with the advice and consent of the council.

, the Mayor of the Borough of Bay Head is Republican William W. Curtis, whose term of office ends December 31, 2023. Members of the Bay Head Borough Council are Council President Douglas J. Lyons (R, 2022), Jennifer Barnes-Gambert (R, 2023), Diane M. Cornell (R, 2024), James W. Gates (R, 2023), Holly MacPherson (R, 2022) and Dennis J. Shaning (R, 2024).

In February 2020, the Borough Council chose Andrew Frizzell from a list of three candidates nominated by the Republican municipal committee to fill the term expiring in December 2020 that became vacant following the resignation of Brian Magory.

Federal, state and county representation
Bay Head is located in the 4th Congressional district and is part of New Jersey's 10th state legislative district.

 

Ocean County is governed by a Board of County Commissioners comprised of five members who are elected on an at-large basis in partisan elections and serving staggered three-year terms of office, with either one or two seats coming up for election each year as part of the November general election. At an annual reorganization held in the beginning of January, the board chooses a Director and a Deputy Director from among its members. , Ocean County's Commissioners (with party affiliation, term-end year and residence) are:

Commissioner Director John P. Kelly (R, 2022, Eagleswood Township),
Commissioner Deputy Director Virginia E. Haines (R, 2022, Toms River),
Barbara Jo Crea (R, 2024, Little Egg Harbor Township)
Gary Quinn (R, 2024, Lacey Township) and
Joseph H. Vicari (R, 2023, Toms River). Constitutional officers elected on a countywide basis are 
County Clerk Scott M. Colabella (R, 2025, Barnegat Light),
Sheriff Michael G. Mastronardy (R, 2022; Toms River) and
Surrogate Jeffrey Moran (R, 2023, Beachwood).

Politics

The city of Bay Head has voted for all Republican presidential candidates since at least 1932, if not all but William Howard Taft's 1912 presidential campaign. The best showing being Dwight Eisenhower's 1956 re-election bid.

As of March 23, 2011, there were a total of 837 registered voters in Bay Head, of which 115 (13.7%) were registered as Democrats, 453 (54.1%) were registered as Republicans and 269 (32.1%) were registered as Unaffiliated. There were no voters registered to other parties. Among the borough's 2010 Census population, 86.5% (vs. 63.2% in Ocean County) were registered to vote, including 102.3% of those ages 18 and over (vs. 82.6% countywide).

In the 2013 gubernatorial election, Republican Chris Christie received 80.4% of the vote (370 cast), ahead of Democrat Barbara Buono with 17.8% (82 votes), and other candidates with 1.7% (8 votes), among the 471 ballots cast by the borough's 838 registered voters (11 ballots were spoiled), for a turnout of 56.2%. In the 2009 gubernatorial election, Republican Chris Christie received 70.3% of the vote (392 ballots cast), ahead of Democrat Jon Corzine with 22.2% (124 votes), Independent Chris Daggett with 6.3% (35 votes) and other candidates with 0.5% (3 votes), among the 558 ballots cast by the borough's 868 registered voters, yielding a 64.3% turnout.

Education

The Bay Head School District serves students in public school for kindergarten through eighth grade at Bay Head Elementary School. As of the 2017–2018 school year, the district, comprised of one school, had an enrollment of 129 students and 15.2 classroom teachers (on an FTE basis), for a student–teacher ratio of 8.5:1.  The district has been ranked as one of the smallest in the state.

Students in public school for ninth through twelfth grades attend Point Pleasant Beach High School in Point Pleasant Beach, as part of a sending/receiving relationship with the Point Pleasant Beach School District, together with students from Lavallette and Mantoloking. As of the 2017–2018 school year, the high school had an enrollment of 364 students and 36.9 classroom teachers (on an FTE basis), for a student–teacher ratio of 9.9:1.

Transportation

Roads and highways

The main roadway through Bay Head is Route 35, a two-lane highway that connects many of the Jersey Shore's small communities.

Public transportation
NJ Transit trains terminate at the Bay Head station and yard, with service on the North Jersey Coast Line north to Penn Station Newark, Hoboken Terminal and Penn Station New York in Midtown Manhattan.

Climate

According to the Köppen climate classification system, Bay Head, New Jersey has a humid subtropical climate (Cfa). Cfa climates are characterized by all months having an average mean temperature > 32.0 °F (> 0.0 °C), at least four months with an average mean temperature ≥ 50.0 °F (≥ 10.0 °C), at least one month with an average mean temperature ≥ 71.6 °F (≥ 22.0 °C) and no significant precipitation difference between seasons. During the summer months at Bay Head, a cooling afternoon  sea breeze is present on most days, but episodes of extreme heat and humidity can occur with heat index values ≥ 95 °F (≥ 35 °C). On average, the wettest month of the year is July which corresponds with the annual peak in thunderstorm activity. During the winter months, episodes of extreme cold and wind can occur with wind chill values < 0 °F (< −18 °C). The plant hardiness zone at Bay Head Beach is 7a with an average annual extreme minimum air temperature of 3.5 °F (−15.8 °C).

Ecology

According to the A. W. Kuchler U.S. potential natural vegetation types, Bay Head, New Jersey would have an Appalachian Oak (104) vegetation type with an Eastern Hardwood Forest (25) vegetation form.

Notable people

People who were born in, residents of, or otherwise closely associated with Bay Head include:

 Bobbi Brown (born 1957), cosmetologist and media contributor
 Dean Cetrulo (1919–2010), fencer who won a bronze medal in the team sabre event at the 1948 Summer Olympics
 Leavitt Howe (1836–1904), founder with brother Edward Howe and two others of Bayhead Land Company, 1879
 L. Ron Hubbard (1911–1986), who wrote Dianetics: The Modern Science of Mental Health, the basis for Scientology in Bay Head in 1950
 James C. Kellogg III (1915–1980), Chairman of the Port Authority of New York and New Jersey
 Peter Kellogg (born 1943), director of the Wall Street investment firm Spear, Leeds & Kellogg, which was sold to Goldman Sachs in 2000 for $5.5 billion
 Roger King (1944–2007), Producer, Owner of King World Productions, produces game shows such as Wheel of Fortune, and Jeopardy!; and co-produces alongside Oprah Winfrey and Dr. Phil McGraw
 John B. Paolella (born 1949), politician who represented the 38th Legislative District in both houses of the New Jersey Legislature
 Dana Perino (born 1972), political commentator
 Michael F. Price (born 1951), value investor and fund manager
 Val Skinner (born 1960), LPGA golfer
 John Wanamaker (1838–1922), retailer who spent many summers at his cottage at the beach

References

External links

 Borough of Bay Head official website
 Bay Head Elementary School
 
 School Data for the Bay Head Elementary School, National Center for Education Statistics
 Bay Head Historical Society
 Bay Head Reading Center – Ocean County Library

 
1886 establishments in New Jersey
Borough form of New Jersey government
Boroughs in Ocean County, New Jersey
Jersey Shore communities in Ocean County
Populated places established in 1886